The Miss North Carolina World competition is a beauty pageant that selects the representative for North Carolina in the Miss World America pageant.

The current Miss North Carolina World is Peyton Brown of Dunn.

Winners 
Color key

Notes to table

References

External links

North Carolina culture
Women in North Carolina